Ashley Nimalanayagam Soundaranayagam (6 November 1950 – 7 November 2000) was a Sri Lankan Tamil teacher, politician and Member of Parliament.

Soundaranayagam was born on 6 November 1950, in Morokkotanchenai, Batticaloa District in Eastern Sri Lanka. He was a school principal.

He was elected to Parliament to represent the Kalkudah Electoral District in the 2000 parliamentary elections. He secured the position with a total of 15,687 personal preference votes.

Soundaranayagam was assassinated on 7 November 2000 in Kiran, less than a month after the 10 October elections. His private secretary who was travelling with him during the assassination, had only sustained minor injury during the attack, and was later held on suspicion by the police. The assassination was blamed on Karuna Amman, the Eastern Regional Commander for the rebel Liberation Tigers of Tamil Eelam.

The assassination brought out the public's frustration both at LTTE, and also at the Sri Lankan government. The LTTE were criticized for their long history of assassinating Tamil political figures who sought and end to ethnic conflicts through democracy.  The Sri Lankan government on the other hand, were criticized for not acting against these assassinations and protecting the democratic freedom of the Tamil people.

References

1950 births
2000 deaths
Members of the 11th Parliament of Sri Lanka
Assassinated Sri Lankan politicians
Assassinated educators
People from Eastern Province, Sri Lanka
People killed during the Sri Lankan Civil War
Sri Lankan Tamil politicians
Sri Lankan Tamil teachers
Tamil United Liberation Front politicians